Dastagird (also spelled as Dastgerd, Dastigird and Daskara), was an ancient Sasanian city in present-day Iraq, and was close to its capital, Ctesiphon.

Originally known as Artemita, the city was rebuilt and renamed by king Hormizd I (r. 270-271). During the reign of king Khosrow I (r. 531-579), the city greatly expanded and had its own court, palace and fortress. During this period, the city also got a secondary name, Khosrow-shad-Kavadh.  During the reign of the latter's grandson, Khosrow II (r. 590-628), Dastagird became a royal residence of the Sasanians. In 628, Dastagird was sacked by the Byzantine emperor Heraclius. After that, the city completely disappears from sources.

Sources
 

Sasanian cities
Former populated places in Iraq
Khosrow II